Tola is a municipality in the Rivas department of Nicaragua.

Municipalities of the Rivas Department